The   was the 12th edition of the biennial IFMAR 1:10 Electric Off-Road World Championship for 1:10 scale radio-controlled electric off-road buggies sanctioned by the International Federation of Model Auto Racing (IFMAR) to be run over two classes (2WD and 4WD) over seven days between 9 and 16 September 2007. Each class ran for three days.

The national sanctional body, Japan Model Racing Car Association (JMRCA), acted as the host nation on behalf of Far East Model Car Association (FEMCA).  Hakusan Ichirino RC Club acted as the host club for the championship taking place at the Hakusan Arena in Hakusan in Ishikawa Prefecture. It was the second time the 1:10 Electric Off-Road World Championship had taken place in Japan since 1995.

Neil Cragg of the United Kingdom and Ryan Cavaileri of the United States were the defending champions in 2WD and 4WD respectively; the championship was won by Japan's Hayato Matsuzaki of Japan and Jared Tebo of the United States in their respective classes.

Circuit 

Hakusan Arena, also known as Ichirino RC Plaza, is owned by Hakusan Ichirino RC Club. It consisted of two circuits, each for on- and off-road racing. From 2001 until 2007, both circuits had hosted six JMRCA All-Japan Championships. The off-road circuit had the same layout as the one used in the 1:8 All-Japan;  the surface was the same clay soil used for roof tiles.

Report

Qualifying

Race

2WD

A-main, leg 1
The race began when the TQ, Hayato Matsuzaki with Ryan Maifield, gradually caught towards him then took the lead when Matsuzaki turned too early under pressure and crashed at the off-camber corner. Matsuzaki was then chased by Jared Tebo and Ryan Cavalieri, allowing them to pass when Matsuzaki crashed again. Repeated mistakes helped him finish sixth, while Americans Maifield, Tebo and Cavalieri held onto their positions to finish the race.

A-main, leg 2
Matsuzaki made up for his error in the previous leg by taking a quick lead shortly after the start. Mike Truhe followed him but not for long; Matsuzaki increased his pace. Masami Hirosaka, fourth-place finisher in the previous leg, was the quicker driver; he began to make his way through the field in the closing stage. He unsuccessfully attempted several maneuvers against Matsuzaki, who won.

A-main, leg 3
Matsuzaki led Truhe and Maifield from pole but Maifield soon passed Truhe, enabling him to challenge Matsuzaki. Maifield made an error over the moguls that enabled Truhe to pass him. Truhe was eventually passed by Tebo for second place. The pair battled throughout the rest of the race; Tebo beat Truhe by barely a tenth of a second. Matsuzaki, having won the previous leg, was crowned the championship winner.

4WD

A-main, leg 1
Jörn Neumann's car began to have problems when its motor moved during the warmup lap. Team manager Gerd Strenge had to race to get the car repaired in time, with 30 seconds before the first heat was due to start. Masami Hirosaka began to lose pace after he was marshalled twice during the opening lap. The heat became a battle between Top Qualifier Jared Tebo and Ryan Maifield, who pulled away from Ryan Cavalieri and the rest of the field. During the final lap, Maifield rolled, enabling Tebo to maintain a comfortable lead until he rolled himself. Tebo kept the lead because Maifield was unable to close in on time.

A-main, leg 2
Tebo led the second heat with Maifield and Hirosaka trailing behind. At the main straight toward the end of the first lap, Maifield saw an opportunity to overtake Tebo then rolled his car. Maifield fell back several places. Hirosaka took the next available opportunity to challenge Tebo for a few laps before crashing, which gave Tebo a comfortable lead until the end of the heat that earned him his title. Cavalieri was able to overtake Hirosaka for a second-place finish.

A-main, leg 3 
As the newly crowned champion, Tebo sat out of this heat, leaving Maifield to start in front. The driver to challenge him was Cavalieri, who rolled over on the mogul section as he attempted to make a pass. Cavalieri became more determined; he improved his lap times until the final lap when he was able to challenge Maifield. He came up on the inside of Maifield at the left hand sweeper and stepped out, causing him to spin and leave Cavalieri to finish second. The heat-winner Maifield finish second place overall.

Classification

2WD

4WD

See also
IFMAR Worlds taking place in Japan

2015 IFMAR 1:10 Electric Off-Road World Championship

References

External links 
 
 

2007 in Japanese motorsport
IFMAR 1:10 Electric Off-Road World Championship
International sports competitions hosted by Japan